The Antonov An-28 (NATO reporting name Cash) is a twin-engined light turboprop transport aircraft, developed from the Antonov An-14M. It was the winner of a competition against the Beriev Be-30, for use by Aeroflot as a short-range airliner. It first flew in 1969. A total of 191 were built and 16 remain in airline service as at August 2015. After a short pre-production series built by Antonov, it was licence-built in Poland by PZL-Mielec. In 1993, PZL-Mielec developed its own improved variant, the PZL M28 Skytruck.

Development
The An-28 is similar to the An-14 in many aspects, including its wing structure and twin rudders, but features an expanded fuselage and turboprop engines, in place of the An-14's piston engines. The An-28 first flew as a modified An-14 in 1969. The next preproduction model did not fly until 1975. In passenger carrying configuration, accommodation was provided for up to 15 people, in addition to the two-man crew. Production was transferred to PZL-Mielec in 1978. The first Polish-built aircraft did not fly until 1984. The An-28 finally received its Soviet type certificate in 1986.

Variants
An-14A
The original Antonov designation for an enlarged, twin-turboprop version of the An-14.
An-14M
Prototype.
An-28
Twin-engined short-range utility transport aircraft, three built.
An-28RM Bryza 1RM
Search and rescue, air ambulance aircraft.
An-28TD Bryza 1TD
Transport version.
An-28PT
Variant made in Poland with Pratt & Whitney PT6 engines first flown 22 July 1993.

Operators

Civil operators

Major operators of the 16 Antonov An-28 aircraft remaining in airline service include:
 
 Skiva Air (2)
 
 Vostok Airlines (3)
 SiLA (3)
 
 Tajik Air (2)

Former civilian operators
 
 Air Livonia
 Enimex
 
 Avluga-Trans (11)
 
 Kyrgyzstan Airlines (5)
 
 Tepavia Trans (4)
 
 Blue Wing Airlines (formerly operated five with three lost in crashes on 3 April 2008, 15 October 2009, and 15 May 2010)

Military operators
 
 Georgian Air Force – two as of December 2016.
 
 Tanzania Air Force Command – one as of December 2016.

Former military operators
 
 Djibouti Air Force two retired.
 
 Peruvian Army two in storage

Former operators
 
 Aeroflot
 Soviet Air Force

Notable accidents and incidents
19 October 1992
Aeroflot Flight 302 stalled and crashed shortly after takeoff from Ust-Nem, Russia following a loss of control due to engine failure, killing 15 of 16 on board. 
29 December 1999
Ecuato Guineana (3C-JJI) An-28 crashed into the Black Sea off İnebolu, killing all six people on board.
23 November 2001
ELK Airways Flight 1007, an An-28 ES-NOV operated by Enimex, struck trees and crashed about 1.5 km from the airport while attempting to land in bad weather at Kärdla Airport, Estonia. Of the 14 passengers and 3 crew on board, 2 passengers were killed.
29 August 2002
Vostok Aviation Company Flight 359 struck a mountain slope near Ayan, Russia after the pilot descended too soon during the approach to Ayan, killing all 16 on board.
25 May 2005
A chartered Maniema Union An-28, owned by Victoria Air, crashed into a mountain near Walungu in the Democratic Republic of the Congo, about 30 minutes after takeoff. All of the 22 passengers and five crew members were killed.
3 August 2006
A TRACEP-Congo Aviation An-28 (9Q-COM) struck a mountainside in low cloud while descending for Bukavu, Democratic Republic of the Congo, killing all 17 on board.
3 April 2008
A Blue Wing Airlines An-28 crashed upon landing near Benzdorp in Suriname. All 19 on board were killed.
15 October 2009
A Blue Wing Airlines An-28 overran the runway on landing at Kwamelasemoetoe Airstrip, Suriname and hit an obstacle. The aircraft was substantially damaged and four people were injured, one seriously.
15 May 2010
The two pilots and six passengers died.
30 January 2012
A TRACEP-Congo Aviation An-28 crashed while on a domestic cargo flight from Bukavu-Kamenbe Airport to Namoya Airstrip, Democratic Republic of the Congo, killing three of the five crew.
12 September 2012
Petropavlovsk-Kamchatsky Air Flight 251 crashed while on a domestic flight from Petropavlovsk-Kamchatsky to Palana Airport, killing ten of 14 people.
16 July 2021
SiLA Airlines Flight 42 force-landed and crashed upside-down in the Bakcharsky District, Tomsk Oblast, Russia after both engines failed due to icing; all 18 on board survived.
27 February 2022
An An-28 was damaged by Russian artillery during the attack on Hostomel.

Specifications (An-28)

See also

References

External links

 List of all PZL M28 aircraft used by Polish Air Force
 An-28/M28/M28B production list

An-028
Antonov An-028
High-wing aircraft
Aircraft first flown in 1969
Twin-turboprop tractor aircraft
Twin-tail aircraft